The Open du Pays d'Aix is a tennis tournament held in Aix-en-Provence, France since 2014. The event is part of the ATP Challenger Tour and is played on outdoor clay courts.

Diego Schwartzman and Robin Haase were the only two tennis players to win both singles and doubles titles in the same year.

Past finals

Singles

Doubles

External links
 Official website

 
ATP Challenger Tour
Tennis tournaments in France
Clay court tennis tournaments
Recurring sporting events established in 2014